Facundo Argüello (born 4 August 1992) is an Argentine tennis player. He played in an ATP 250 doubles event in 2011.

In 2013 he played the qualifying stages of the Roland Garros Open and US Open. In 2014 he won the Itajai Challenger, beating Diego Schwartzman in the final match. He qualified directly to the 2014 Roland Garros Open, where he lost to world number 43 Radek Štěpánek after winning the first two sets. In the 2015 Roland Garros draw, he faced Andy Murray in the first round, Murray won in straight sets.

Challenger and Futures finals

Singles: 31 (15–16)

Doubles: 32 (20–12)

References

Sources

Argentine male tennis players
Living people
1992 births
Sportspeople from Córdoba, Argentina
Tennis players at the 2011 Pan American Games
Pan American Games competitors for Argentina
South American Games gold medalists for Argentina
South American Games silver medalists for Argentina
South American Games medalists in tennis
Competitors at the 2010 South American Games